"Son of a Rotten Gambler" is a song written by Chip Taylor and performed by Anne Murray.  The song reached No. 1 on the Canadian Adult Contemporary chart, #3 on the Canadian Country chart, and #5 on the U.S. Country chart in 1974. The song appeared on her 1974 album, Love Song.  The song was produced by Brian Ahern.

Other versions
The Hollies released a version of the song in 1974.
Emmylou Harris released a version in 1981 on her album, Cimarron.

Chart performance

Anne Murray

References

1974 songs
Songs written by Chip Taylor
Anne Murray songs
The Hollies songs
Emmylou Harris songs
Song recordings produced by Brian Ahern (producer)